Brittany Nicole Carpentero (born May 20, 1988), better known by her stage name Diamond is an American rapper from Atlanta, Georgia.

Early life
Brittany Nicole Carpentero was born May 20, 1988, in Atlanta, Georgia, to an African American mother and a Puerto Rican father.

Career

Crime Mob, 2004–2007

At the age of fifteen, Diamond joined the group Crime Mob in 2004. Crime Mob first garnered national attention in 2004 with their single "Knuck If You Buck," which was eventually certified Platinum. They released their debut album Crime Mob later that summer. Their next charting single, "Rock Yo Hips," was released in August 2006 and was followed by a second album, Hated on Mostly, in March 2007.

Solo career & various mixtapes, 2008–present
In November 2007, Diamond left Crime Mob to pursue a solo career and signed a management deal with Polo Grounds Music. In 2010, she appeared on the remix version of the Ludacris single "My Chick Bad", along with Trina and Eve. Her debut single "Lotta Money" was released in the summer of 2010; the video for the single included Gucci Mane. In 2011, Diamond released a song featuring Waka Flocka called "Hit That Hoe" a video was released in August 2011. Also in November 2011 Diamond released her single "Buy It All" on BET's 106 & Park. Diamond was nominated for Best Female Hip Hop Artist at the BET Awards of 2011. Diamond released her new single "Loose Screws" in 2012. She was nominated the second time for Best Female Hip-Hop Artist at the BET Awards 2012.

Diamond released her album The Young Life on August 28, 2012, with the singles "American Woman" featuring Verse Simmonds and "Love Like Mine" featuring Nikkiya. Diamond is slated to appear as a cast-member for the Oxygen docu-series Sisterhood of Hip Hop. “I now have an all-girl group called Girl Code,” she says. “It’s a mixture of rock and rap. As I mature, my musical taste has grown as well — but I can never leave my fans behind and forget my musical roots.”

Influences 
Diamond has stated that artists who have influenced her musical style include Lil' Kim, Trina,  Eve,  Salt n Pepa, Da Brat, The Notorious B.I.G.,  Missy Elliott,  Timbaland,  Queen Latifah,  Eminem,   Foxy Brown,  DMX, Outkast, Snoop Dogg, and Tupac Shakur.

Discography

Mixtapes 
 2007: Bitch Musik
 2008: Bitch Musik Vol. 2: Ms. Boojhetto
 2009: P.M.S. (Pardon My Swag)
 2010: Bitch Musik: Part Three
 2010: Cocaine Waitress
 2011: Bitch Musik 4: Poor Little Rich Gurl
 2012: The Young Life
 2016: SHE (Shelved / Unreleased)
 2017: P.M.S. (PARDON MY SLAYAGE)  
 2019: Vagina Power EP (feat. Princess)

As featured performer

Promotional singles

As featured artist

Guest appearances

References

External links
 Diamond Interview with HipHopAtLunch

1988 births
African-American crunk musicians
American women rappers
African-American women rappers
American people of Puerto Rican descent
Hispanic and Latino American rappers
Living people
Puerto Rican women rappers
Rappers from Atlanta
Southern hip hop musicians
21st-century American rappers
21st-century American women musicians
21st-century African-American women
21st-century African-American musicians
20th-century African-American people
20th-century African-American women
21st-century women rappers